Tomris Giritlioğlu (born 1957) is a Turkish film director and producer. She is best known for directing the 1999 film Mrs. Salkım's Diamonds.

Selected filmography

References

External links 

1957 births
Living people
Turkish film directors